Kingsway Underpass may refer to:

The Kingsway Tunnel in Liverpool
The former Kingsway tramway subway in Holborn
The Strand underpass in London